Robert Valge (born 20 April 1997) is an Estonian professional basketball player who plays for BC Pärnu of the Latvian-Estonian Basketball League. He is a 1.92 m (6 ft 4 in) tall shooting guard.

Professional career
Valge began playing basketball with BC Pärnu in the Estonian League. He moved to Spain in 2016 and played one season for Palencia of the LEB Oro league and their Liga EBA affiliate team Baloncesto Venta de Baños. In 2017 Valge signed with Liga ACB team San Pablo Burgos, but played mostly for their Liga EBA affiliate team Grupo de Automoción Santiago. In 2017 he spent a three-month loan spell in LEB Plata team Plasencia Extremadura. In 2019 he moved back to native Estonia to play for University of Tartu basketball team.

Career statistics

Domestic leagues

Estonia national team

|-
| style="text-align:left;"| 2013
| style="text-align:left;"| 2013 FIBA Europe Under-16 Championship Division B
| style="text-align:left;"| Estonia U-16
| 9 || 9 || 37.6 || .436 || .333 || .639 || 4.1 || 1.3 || 1.3 || .1 || 18.2
|-
| style="text-align:left;"| 2014
| style="text-align:left;"| 2014 FIBA Europe Under-18 Championship Division B
| style="text-align:left;"| Estonia U-18
| 7 || 5 || 25.1 || .444 || .391 || .500 || 2.4 || 1.4 || .7 || .6 || 12.3
|-
| style="text-align:left;"| 2015
| style="text-align:left;"| 2015 FIBA Europe Under-18 Championship Division B
| style="text-align:left;"| Estonia U-18
| 9 || 9 || 27.4 || .422 || .340 || .619 || 1.6 || 1.0 || .9 || .3 || 14.2

References

External links
 Robert Valge at basket.ee 
 Robert Valge at fiba.com

1997 births
Living people
Estonian men's basketball players
Estonian expatriate basketball people in Spain
Korvpalli Meistriliiga players
Shooting guards
Basketball players from Tallinn
Tartu Ülikool/Rock players